Usmanov or Usmonov is a masculine surname, its feminine counterpart is Usmanova or Usmonova. Notable people with the surname include:

 Alexei Usmanov, Russian tenor
 Alisher Usmanov (born 1953), Russian businessman
 Imran Usmanov (born 1953), Chechen folk singer
Jamshed Usmonov (born 1965), Tajik film director and producer
Irina Viner-Usmanova (born 1948), Russian rhythmic gymnastics coach
Nilufar Usmanova (born 1987), Uzbek singer and actress
Rustam Usmonov (born 1977), Tajikistani football player
Yulduz Usmonova (born 1963), Uzbek singer and actress
 Zafar Usmanov (born 1937),  Soviet and Tajik mathematician  
Zamira Ismailovna Usmanova, Uzbek archaeologist

See also
Haidar Usmonov, a town and jamoat in north-west Tajikistan